The Second Sino-Japanese War (1937–1945) or War of Resistance (Chinese term) was a military conflict primarily between the Republic of China and the Empire of Japan. The war made up the Chinese theater of the wider Pacific Theater of the Second World War. The beginning of the war is conventionally dated to the Marco Polo Bridge Incident on 7 July 1937, when a dispute between Japanese and Chinese troops in Peking escalated into a full-scale invasion. Some Chinese historians consider the start of the war as the Japanese invasion of Manchuria on 18 September 1931. China was aided by the Soviet Union, the United Kingdom, the United States, and Nazi Germany before its alliance with Japan. Around 20 million people, mostly civilians, were killed.

This full-scale war between China and the Empire of Japan is often regarded as the beginning of World War II in Asia, although some scholars consider the European War and the Pacific War to be entirely separate, albeit concurrent. The Second Sino-Japanese War was the largest Asian war in the 20th century, and it has been called "the Asian holocaust." After the Japanese attacks on Malaya and Pearl Harbor in 1941, the war merged with other conflicts which are generally categorized under the China Burma India Theater of World War II.

In 1931, the Mukden Incident was the pretext for the Japanese invasion of Manchuria. The Chinese were defeated and Japan created a new puppet state, Manchukuo; many historians consider this the beginning of the Second Sino-Japanese War. From 1931 to 1937, China and Japan continued to skirmish in small, localized "incidents".

Following the Marco Polo Bridge Incident, the Japanese scored major victories, capturing Beijing, Shanghai and the Chinese capital of Nanjing in 1937, which resulted in the Rape of Nanjing. After failing to stop the Japanese in the Battle of Wuhan, the Chinese central government relocated to Chongqing (Chungking) in the Chinese interior.  Following the Sino-Soviet Treaty of 1937, strong material support helped the Nationalist Army of China and the Chinese Air Force continue the fierce resistance against the Japanese offensive. 

By 1939, after Chinese victories in Changsha and Guangxi, and with Japan's lines of communications stretched deep into the Chinese interior, the war reached a stalemate. While Japan ruled the large cities, they lacked sufficient manpower to control China's vast countryside. The Japanese were unable to defeat Chinese Communist Party (CCP) forces in Shaanxi, who waged a campaign of sabotage and guerrilla warfare against the invaders. However Japan ultimately succeeded in the year-long Battle of South Guangxi, occupying Nanning and cutting off the last sea access to the wartime capital of Chongqing. In November 1939, Chinese nationalist forces launched a large scale winter offensive, while in August 1940, CCP forces launched an offensive in central China. The United States supported China through a series of increasing boycotts against Japan, culminating with cutting off steel and petrol exports to Japan in June 1941. Additionally, American volunteers such as the Flying Tigers fought for China directly.

In December 1941, Japan launched its surprise attack on Pearl Harbor and started war with the United States. The US increased its flow of aid to China: the Lend-Lease act gave China a total of $1.6 billion ($20.19 billion 2023). With Burma cut off, the US Air Force airlifted material over the Himalayas. In 1944, Japan launched Operation Ichi-Go, the invasion of Henan and Changsha. However, this failed to bring about the surrender of Chinese forces. In 1945, the Chinese Expeditionary Force resumed its advance in Burma and completed the Ledo Road linking India to China. At the same time, China launched large counteroffensives in South China and retook West Hunan and Guangxi. 

Japan formally surrendered on 2 September 1945. China was recognized as one of the Big Four Allies during the war, regained all territories lost to Japan, and became one of the five permanent members of the United Nations Security Council. The Chinese Civil War resumed in 1946.

Names

In China, the war is most commonly known as the "War of Resistance against Japanese Aggression", and shortened to the "Resistance against Japanese Aggression" or the "War of Resistance". It was also called the "Eight Years' War of Resistance", but in 2017 the Chinese Ministry of Education issued a directive stating that textbooks were to refer to the war as the "Fourteen Years' War of Resistance", reflecting a focus on the broader conflict with Japan going back to the 1931 Japanese invasion of Manchuria. According to historian Rana Mitter, historians in China are unhappy with the blanket revision, and (despite sustained tensions) the Republic of China did not consider itself to be continuously at war with Japan over these six years. It is also referred to as part of the "Global Anti-Fascist War", which is how World War II is perceived by the Chinese Communist Party (CCP) and the PRC government.

In Japan, nowadays, the name "Japan–China War" is most commonly used because of its perceived objectivity. When the invasion of China proper began in earnest in July 1937 near Beijing, the government of Japan used "The North China Incident", and with the outbreak of the Battle of Shanghai the following month, it was changed to "The China Incident".

The word "incident" was used by Japan, as neither country had made a formal declaration of war. From the Japanese perspective, localizing these conflicts was beneficial in preventing intervention from other nations, particularly the United Kingdom and the United States, which were its primary source of petroleum and steel respectively. A formal expression of these conflicts would potentially lead to American embargo in accordance with the Neutrality Acts of the 1930s. In addition, due to China's fractured political status, Japan often claimed that China was no longer a recognizable political entity on which war could be declared.

Other names
In Japanese propaganda, the invasion of China became a crusade, the first step of the "eight corners of the world under one roof" slogan. In 1940, Japanese Prime Minister Fumimaro Konoe launched the Taisei Yokusankai. When both sides formally declared war in December 1941, the name was replaced by "Greater East Asia War".

Although the Japanese government still uses the term "China Incident" in formal documents, the word Shina is considered derogatory by China and therefore the media in Japan often paraphrase with other expressions like "The Japan–China Incident", which were used by media as early as the 1930s.

The name "Second Sino-Japanese War" is not commonly used in Japan as the war it fought against China in 1894 to 1895 was led by the Qing dynasty, and thus is called the Qing-Japanese War, rather than the First Sino-Japanese War.

Background

Previous war
The origins of the Second Sino-Japanese War can be traced back to the First Sino-Japanese War of 1894–1895, in which China, then under the rule of the Qing dynasty, was defeated by Japan, forced to cede Taiwan, and to recognize the full and complete independence of Korea in the Treaty of Shimonoseki; Japan also annexed the Diaoyudao/Senkaku Islands in early 1895 as a result of its victory at the end of the war (Japan claims the islands were uninhabited in 1895). The Qing dynasty was on the brink of collapse due to internal revolts and the imposition of the unequal treaties, while Japan had emerged as a great power through its effective modernization measures.

Reasons for launching the war

Republic of China
The Republic of China was founded in 1912, following the Xinhai Revolution which overthrew the last imperial dynasty of China, the Qing dynasty (1644–1911). However, central authority quickly disintegrated and the Republic's authority succumbed to that of regional warlords, mostly from the former Beiyang Army. Unifying the nation and expelling the influence of foreign powers seemed a very remote possibility. Some warlords even aligned themselves with various foreign powers in their battles with each other. For example, the warlord Zhang Zuolin of Manchuria from the Fengtian clique openly cooperated with the Japanese for military and economic assistance.

Twenty-One Demands
In 1915, Japan issued the Twenty-One Demands to extort further political and commercial privilege from China, which was accepted by Yuan Shikai. Following World War I, Japan acquired the German Empire's sphere of influence in Shandong province, leading to nationwide anti-Japanese protests and mass demonstrations in China. Under the Beiyang Government, China remained fragmented and was unable to resist foreign incursions. For the purpose of unifying China and defeating the regional warlords, the Kuomintang (KMT, alternatively known as the Chinese Nationalist Party) in Guangzhou launched the Northern Expedition from 1926 to 1928 with limited assistance from the Soviet Union.

Jinan incident

The National Revolutionary Army (NRA) formed by the KMT swept through southern and central China until it was checked in Shandong, where confrontations with the Japanese garrison escalated into armed conflict. The conflicts were collectively known as the Jinan incident of 1928, during which time the Japanese military killed several Chinese officials and fired artillery shells into Jinan. Between 2,000 and 11,000 Chinese and Japanese civilians were believed to have been killed during these conflicts. Relations between the Chinese Nationalist government and Japan severely worsened as a result of the Jinan incident.

Reunification of China (1928)

As the National Revolutionary Army approached Beijing, Zhang Zuolin decided to retreat back to Manchuria, before he was assassinated by the Kwantung Army in 1928. His son, Zhang Xueliang, took over as the leader of the Fengtian clique in Manchuria. Later in the same year, Zhang decided to declare his allegiance to the Nationalist government in Nanjing under Chiang Kai-shek, and consequently, China was nominally reunified under one government.

1929 Sino-Soviet war

The July–November 1929 conflict over the Chinese Eastern Railroad (CER) further increased the tensions in the Northeast that led to the Mukden Incident and eventually the Second Sino-Japanese War. The Soviet Red Army victory over Zhang Xueliang's forces not only reasserted Soviet control over the CER in Manchuria but revealed Chinese military weaknesses that Japanese Kwantung Army officers were quick to note.

The Soviet Red Army performance also stunned the Japanese. Manchuria was central to Japan's East Asia policy. Both the 1921 and 1927 Imperial Eastern Region Conferences reconfirmed Japan's commitment to be the dominant power in the Northeast. The 1929 Red Army victory shook that policy to the core and reopened the Manchurian problem. By 1930, the Kwantung Army realized they faced a Red Army that was only growing stronger. The time to act was drawing near and Japanese plans to conquer the Northeast were accelerated.

Chinese Communist Party

In 1930, the Central Plains War broke out across China, involving regional commanders who had fought in alliance with the Kuomintang during the Northern Expedition, and the Nanjing government under Chiang. The Chinese Communist Party (CCP) previously fought openly against the Nanjing government after the Shanghai massacre of 1927, and they continued to expand during this civil war. The Kuomintang government in Nanjing decided to focus their efforts on suppressing the Chinese Communists through the Encirclement Campaigns, following the policy of "first internal pacification, then external resistance".

Historical development

Prelude: invasion of Manchuria and Northern China

The internecine warfare in China provided excellent opportunities for Japan, which saw Manchuria as a limitless supply of raw materials, a market for its manufactured goods (now excluded from the markets of many Western countries as a result of Depression-era tariffs), and a protective buffer state against the Soviet Union in Siberia. Japan invaded Manchuria outright after the Mukden Incident in September 1931. Japan charged that its rights in Manchuria, which had been established as a result of its victory at the end of the Russo-Japanese War, had been systematically violated and there were "more than 120 cases of infringement of rights and interests, interference with business, boycott of Japanese goods, unreasonable taxation, detention of individuals, confiscation of properties, eviction, demand for cessation of business, assault and battery, and the oppression of Korean residents".

After five months of fighting, Japan established the puppet state of Manchukuo in 1932, and installed the last Emperor of China, Puyi, as its puppet ruler. Militarily too weak to challenge Japan directly, China appealed to the League of Nations for help. The League's investigation led to the publication of the Lytton Report, condemning Japan for its incursion into Manchuria, causing Japan to withdraw from the League of Nations. No country took action against Japan beyond tepid censure.

Incessant fighting followed the Mukden Incident. In 1932, Chinese and Japanese troops fought the January 28 Incident battle. This resulted in the demilitarization of Shanghai, which forbade the Chinese to deploy troops in their own city. In Manchukuo there was an ongoing campaign to defeat the Anti-Japanese Volunteer Armies that arose from widespread outrage over the policy of non-resistance to Japan.

In 1933, the Japanese attacked the Great Wall region. The Tanggu Truce established in its aftermath, gave Japan control of Rehe province as well as a demilitarized zone between the Great Wall and Beiping-Tianjin region. Japan aimed to create another buffer zone between Manchukuo and the Chinese Nationalist government in Nanjing.

Japan increasingly exploited China's internal conflicts to reduce the strength of its fractious opponents. Even years after the Northern Expedition, the political power of the Nationalist government was limited to just the area of the Yangtze River Delta. Other sections of China were essentially in the hands of local Chinese warlords. Japan sought various Chinese collaborators and helped them establish governments friendly to Japan. This policy was called the Specialization of North China, more commonly known as the North China Autonomous Movement. The northern provinces affected by this policy were Chahar, Suiyuan, Hebei, Shanxi, and Shandong.

This Japanese policy was most effective in the area of what is now Inner Mongolia and Hebei. In 1935, under Japanese pressure, China signed the He–Umezu Agreement, which forbade the KMT to conduct party operations in Hebei. In the same year, the Chin–Doihara Agreement was signed expelling the KMT from Chahar. Thus, by the end of 1935 the Chinese government had essentially abandoned northern China. In its place, the Japanese-backed East Hebei Autonomous Council and the Hebei–Chahar Political Council were established. There in the empty space of Chahar the Mongol Military Government was formed on 12 May 1936. Japan provided all the necessary military and economic aid. Afterwards Chinese volunteer forces continued to resist Japanese aggression in Manchuria, and Chahar and Suiyuan.

Some Chinese historians believe the 18 September 1931 Japanese invasion of Manchuria marks the start of the War of Resistance. Although not the conventional Western view, British historian Rana Mitter describes this Chinese trend of historical analysis as "perfectly reasonable." In 2017, the Chinese government officially announced that it would adopt this view. Under this interpretation, the 1931-1937 period is viewed as the "partial" war, while 1937-1945 is a period of "total" war. This view of a fourteen-year war has political significance because it provides more recognition for the role of northeast China in the War of Resistance.

1937: Full-scale invasion of China

On the night of 7 July 1937, Chinese and Japanese troops exchanged fire in the vicinity of the Marco Polo (or Lugou) Bridge, a crucial access-route to Beijing. What began as confused, sporadic skirmishing soon escalated into a full-scale battle in which Beijing and its port city of Tianjin fell to Japanese forces (July–August 1937). On 29 July, some 5,000 troops of the 1st and 2nd Corps of the East Hopei Army mutinied, turning against the Japanese garrison. In addition to Japanese military personnel, some 260 civilians living in Tongzhou were massacred during the uprising in scenes reminiscent of the Boxer Protocol in 1901. These were predominantly Japanese, including the police force, and some ethnic Koreans. The Chinese then set fire to and destroyed much of the city. Only around 60 Japanese civilians survived, who provided both journalists and later historians with firsthand witness accounts. As a result of such violence, the Tungchow mutiny strongly shook public opinion in Japan.

Battle of Shanghai

The Imperial General Headquarters (GHQ) in Tokyo, content with the gains acquired in northern China following the Marco Polo Bridge Incident, initially showed reluctance to escalate the conflict into a full-scale war. The KMT however, determined that the "breaking point" of Japanese aggression had been reached. Chiang Kai-shek quickly mobilized the central government's army and air force, placing them under his direct command. Following the shooting of a Japanese officer who attempted to enter the Hongqiao military airport on 9 August 1937, the Japanese demanded that all Chinese forces withdraw from Shanghai; the Chinese outright refused to meet this demand. In response, both the Chinese and the Japanese marched reinforcements into the Shanghai area.

On 13 August 1937, Kuomintang soldiers attacked Japanese Marine positions in Shanghai, with Japanese army troops and marines in turn crossing into the city with naval gunfire support at Zhabei, leading to the Battle of Shanghai. On 14 August, Chinese forces under the command of Zhang Zhizhong were ordered to capture or destroy the Japanese strongholds in Shanghai, leading to bitter street fighting. In an attack on the Japanese cruiser Izumo, Kuomintang planes accidentally bombed the Shanghai International Settlement, which led to more than 3,000 civilian deaths.

In the three days from 14 August through 16, 1937, the Imperial Japanese Navy (IJN) sent many sorties of the then-advanced long-ranged G3M medium-heavy land-based bombers and assorted carrier-based aircraft with the expectation of destroying the Chinese Air Force. However, the Imperial Japanese Navy encountered unexpected resistance from the defending Chinese Curtiss Hawk II/Hawk III and P-26/281 Peashooter fighter squadrons; suffering heavy (50%) losses from the defending Chinese pilots (14 August was subsequently commemorated by the KMT as China's Air Force Day).

The skies of China had become a testing zone for advanced biplane and new-generation monoplane combat-aircraft designs. The introduction of the advanced A5M "Claude" fighters into the Shanghai-Nanjing theater of operations, beginning on 18 September 1937, helped the Japanese achieve a certain level of air superiority. However the few experienced Chinese veteran pilots, as well as several Chinese-American volunteer fighter pilots, including Maj. Art Chin, Maj. John Wong Pan-yang, and Capt. Chan Kee-Wong, even in their older and slower biplanes, proved more than able to hold their own against the sleek A5Ms in dogfights, and it also proved to be a battle of attrition against the Chinese Air Force. At the start of the battle, the local strength of the NRA was around five divisions, or about 70,000 troops, while local Japanese forces comprised about 6,300 marines. On 23 August, the Chinese Air Force attacked Japanese troop landings at Wusongkou in northern Shanghai with Hawk III fighter-attack planes and P-26/281 fighter escorts, and the Japanese intercepted most of the attack with A2N and A4N fighters from the aircraft carriers Hosho and Ryujo, shooting down several of the Chinese planes while losing a single A4N in the dogfight with Lt. Huang Xinrui in his P-26/281; the Japanese Army reinforcements succeeded in landing in northern Shanghai. The Imperial Japanese Army (IJA) ultimately committed over 200,000 troops, along with numerous naval vessels and aircraft, to capture the city. After more than three months of intense fighting, their casualties far exceeded initial expectations. On 26 October, the IJA captured Dachang, an key strong-point within Shanghai, and on 5 November, additional reinforcements from Japan landed in Hangzhou Bay. Finally, on 9 November, the NRA began a general retreat.

Battle of Nanjing and Massacre

Building on the hard-won victory in Shanghai, the IJA captured the KMT capital city of Nanjing (December 1937) and Northern Shanxi (September–November 1937). These campaigns involved approximately 350,000 Japanese soldiers, and considerably more Chinese.

Historian David Askew argued that less than 32,000 civilians and soldiers died and no more than 250,000 civilians could have remained in Nanjing, the vast majority of whom had taken refuge in the Nanjing Safety Zone, a foreign-established safety zone led by John Rabe who was a Nazi party official. 

In 2005, a history textbook prepared by the Japanese Society for History Textbook Reform which had been approved by the government in 2001, sparked huge outcry and protests in China and Korea. It referred to the Nanjing Massacre and other atrocities such as the Manila massacre as an "incident", glossed over the issue of comfort women, and made only brief references to the death of Chinese soldiers and civilians in Nanjing. A copy of the 2005 version of a junior high school textbook titled New History Textbook found that there is no mention of the "Nanjing Massacre" or the "Nanjing Incident". Indeed, the only one sentence that referred to this event was: "they [the Japanese troops] occupied that city in December".

1938
At the start of 1938, the leadership in Tokyo still hoped to limit the scope of the conflict to occupy areas around Shanghai, Nanjing and most of northern China. They thought this would preserve strength for an anticipated showdown with the Soviet Union, but by now the Japanese government and GHQ had effectively lost control of the Japanese army in China. With many victories achieved, Japanese field generals escalated the war in Jiangsu in an attempt to wipe out Chinese resistance, but were defeated at the Battle of Taierzhuang (March–April 1938). Afterwards the IJA changed its strategy and deployed almost all of its existing armies in China to attack the city of Wuhan, which had become the political, economic and military center of rump China, in hopes of destroying the fighting strength of the NRA and of forcing the KMT government to negotiate for peace. On 6 June, they captured Kaifeng, the capital of Henan, and threatened to take Zhengzhou, the junction of the Pinghan and Longhai railways.

1938 Yellow River flood

To prevent Japanese advances in western and southern China, Chiang Kai-shek, at the suggestion of Chen Guofu, ordered the opening of the dikes on the Yellow River near Zhengzhou. The original plan was to destroy the dike in Zhaokou, but due to difficulties in that place, the Huayuankou dike on the south bank was destroyed on 5 June and 7 June by excavation, with flood waters over eastern Henan, central Anhui, and north central Jiangsu. The floods covered and destroyed thousands of square kilometers of agricultural land and displaced the mouth of the Yellow River hundreds of miles to the south. Thousands of villages were flooded or destroyed and several million villagers were forced to evacuate from their homes. 400,000 people including Japanese soldiers drowned and an additional 10 million became refugees. Rivers were filled with corpses as Tanka boat dwellers drowned from boat capsize. Damage to plantations also affected the population which generated later hunger. Despite this, the Japanese captured Wuhan on 27 October 1938, forcing the KMT to retreat to Chongqing, but Chiang Kai-shek still refused to negotiate, saying he would only consider talks if Japan agreed to withdraw to the pre-1937 borders. In 1937, the Japanese Imperial Army quickly marched into the heart of Chinese territory.

With Japanese casualties and costs mounting, the Imperial General Headquarters attempted to break Chinese resistance by ordering the air branches of their navy and army to launch the war's first massive air raids on civilian targets. Japanese raiders hit the Kuomintang's newly established provisional capital of Chongqing and most other major cities in unoccupied China, leaving many people either dead, injured, or homeless.

1939–40: Chinese counterattack and stalemate

From the beginning of 1939, the war entered a new phase with the unprecedented defeat of the Japanese at Battle of Suixian–Zaoyang, 1st Battle of Changsha, Battle of South Guangxi and Battle of Zaoyi. These outcomes encouraged the Chinese to launch their first large-scale counter-offensive against the IJA in early 1940; however, due to its low military-industrial capacity and limited experience in modern warfare, this offensive was defeated. Afterwards Chiang could not risk any more all-out offensive campaigns given the poorly trained, under-equipped, and disorganized state of his armies and opposition to his leadership both within the Kuomintang and in China in general. He had lost a substantial portion of his best trained and equipped troops in the Battle of Shanghai and was at times at the mercy of his generals, who maintained a high degree of autonomy from the central KMT government.

During the offensive, Hui forces in Suiyuan under generals Ma Hongbin and Ma Buqing routed the Imperial Japanese Army and their puppet Inner Mongol forces and prevented the planned Japanese advance into northwest China. Ma Hongbin's father Ma Fulu had fought against Japanese in the Boxer Rebellion. General Ma Biao led Hui, Salar and Dongxiang cavalry to defeat the Japanese at the Battle of Huaiyang. Ma Biao fought against the Japanese in the Boxer Rebellion.

After 1940, the Japanese encountered tremendous difficulties in administering and garrisoning the seized territories, and tried to solve their occupation problems by implementing a strategy of creating friendly puppet governments favourable to Japanese interests in the territories conquered, most prominently the Wang Jingwei Government headed by former KMT premier Wang Jingwei. However, atrocities committed by the Imperial Japanese Army, as well as Japanese refusal to delegate any real power, left the puppets very unpopular and largely ineffective. The only success the Japanese had was to recruit a large Collaborationist Chinese Army to maintain public security in the occupied areas.

Japanese expansion
By 1941, Japan held most of the eastern coastal areas of China and Vietnam, but guerrilla fighting continued in these occupied areas. Japan had suffered high casualties from unexpectedly stubborn Chinese resistance, and neither side could make any swift progress in the manner of Nazi Germany in Western Europe.

By 1943, Guangdong had experienced famine. As the situation worsened, New York Chinese compatriots received a letter stating that 600,000 people were killed in Siyi by starvation.

Chinese resistance strategy
The basis of Chinese strategy before the entrance of the Western Allies can be divided into two periods as follows:
 First Period: 7 July 1937 (Battle of Lugou Bridge) – 25 October 1938 (end of the Battle of Wuhan with the fall of the city).
 Second Period: 25 October 1938 (following the Fall of Wuhan) – December 1941 (before the Allies' declaration of war on Japan).

Unlike Japan, China was unprepared for total war and had little military-industrial strength, no mechanized divisions, and few armoured forces. Up until the mid-1930s, China had hoped that the League of Nations would provide countermeasures to Japan's aggression. In addition, the Kuomintang government was in the midst of a civil war against the Chinese Communist Party. Chiang Kai-shek was quoted as saying: "The Japanese are a disease of the skin, the Communists are a disease of the heart". The Second United Front between the KMT and CCP was never truly unified, as even during organized, armed, counteroffensives, the communists, and nationalists still competed for influence.

Even under these extremely unfavourable circumstances, Chiang realized that to win support from the United States and other foreign nations, China had to prove it was capable of fighting. Knowing a hasty retreat would discourage foreign aid, Chiang resolved to make a stand at Shanghai, using the best of his German-trained divisions to defend China's largest and most industrialized city from the Japanese. The battle lasted over three months, saw heavy casualties on both sides, and ended with a Chinese retreat towards Nanjing, but proved that China would not be easily defeated and showed its determination to the world. The battle became an enormous morale booster for the Chinese people, as it decisively refuted the Japanese boast that Japan could conquer Shanghai in three days and China in three months.

Afterwards, China began to adopt the Fabian strategy of "trading space for time". The Chinese army would put up fights to delay the Japanese advance to northern and eastern cities, allowing the home front, with its professionals and key industries, to retreat west into Chongqing. As a result of Chinese troops' scorched earth strategies, dams and levees were intentionally sabotaged to create massive flooding, which caused thousands of deaths and many more to seek refuge.

Second phase: October 1938 – December 1941

During this period, the main Chinese objective was to drag out the war for as long as possible in a war of attrition, thereby exhausting Japanese resources while building up China's military capacity. American general Joseph Stilwell called this strategy "winning by outlasting". The NRA adopted the concept of "magnetic warfare" to attract advancing Japanese troops to definite points where they were subjected to ambush, flanking attacks, and encirclements in major engagements. The most prominent example of this tactic was the successful defense of Changsha in 1939 (and again in 1941), in which heavy casualties were inflicted on the IJA.

Local Chinese resistance forces, organized separately by both the CCP and KMT, continued their resistance in occupied areas to pester the enemy and make their administration over the vast land area of China difficult. In 1940, the Chinese Red Army launched a major offensive in north China, destroying railways and a major coal mine. These constant harassment and sabotage operations deeply frustrated the Imperial Japanese Army and led them to employ the "Three Alls Policy" (kill all, loot all, burn all) (Hanyu Pinyin: Sānguāng Zhèngcè, Japanese On: Sankō Seisaku). It was during this period that the bulk of Japanese war crimes was committed.

By 1941, Japan had occupied much of north and coastal China, but the KMT central government and military had retreated to the western interior to continue their resistance, while the Chinese communists remained in control of base areas in Shaanxi. In the occupied areas, Japanese control was mainly limited to railroads and major cities ("points and lines"). They did not have a major military or administrative presence in the vast Chinese countryside, where Chinese guerrillas roamed freely.

The United States strongly supported China starting in 1937 and warned Japan to get out. However, the United States continued to sell Japan petroleum and scrap metal exports until the Japanese invasion of French Indochina when the U.S. imposed a scrap metal and oil embargo against Japan (and froze all Japanese assets) in the summer of 1941. As the Soviets prepared for war against Nazi Germany in June 1941, and all new Soviet combat aircraft was needed in the west, Chiang Kai-shek sought American support through the Lend-Lease Act that was promised in March 1941.
After the Lend-Lease Act was passed, American financial and military aid began to trickle in. Claire Lee Chennault commanded the 1st American Volunteer Group (nicknamed the Flying Tigers), with American pilots flying American warplanes painted with the Chinese flag to attack the Japanese. He headed both the volunteer group and the uniformed U.S. Army Air Forces units that replaced it in 1942. However, it was the Soviets that provided the greatest material help for China's war of resistance against the imperial Japanese invasion from 1937 into 1941, with fighter aircraft for the Nationalist Chinese Air Force and artillery and armour for the Chinese Army through the Sino-Soviet Treaty; Operation Zet also provided for a group of Soviet volunteer combat aviators to join the Chinese Air Force in the fight against the Japanese occupation from late 1937 through 1939. The United States embargoed Japan in 1941 depriving her of shipments of oil and various other resources necessary to continue the war in China. This pressure, which was intended to disparage a continuation of the war and to bring Japan into negotiation, resulted in the Attack on Pearl Harbor and Japan's drive south to procure from the resource-rich European colonies in Southeast Asia by force the resources which the United States had denied to them.

Relationship between the Nationalists and Communists

After the Mukden Incident in 1931, Chinese public opinion was strongly critical of Manchuria's leader, the "young marshal" Zhang Xueliang, for his non-resistance to the Japanese invasion, even though the Kuomintang central government was also responsible for this policy, giving Zhang an order to "improvise" while not offering support. After losing Manchuria to the Japanese, Zhang and his Northeast Army were given the duty of suppressing the Red Army of the Chinese Communist Party  in Shaanxi after their Long March. This resulted in great casualties for his Northeast Army, which received no support in manpower or weaponry from Chiang Kai-shek.

On 12 December 1936, a deeply disgruntled Zhang Xueliang kidnapped Chiang Kai-shek in Xi'an, hoping to force an end to the conflict between KMT and CCP. To secure the release of Chiang, the KMT agreed to a temporary ceasefire of the Chinese Civil War and, on 24 December, the formation of a United Front with the communists against Japan. The alliance having salutary effects for the beleaguered CCP, agreed to form the New Fourth Army and the 8th Route Army and place them under the nominal control of the NRA. In agreement with KMT, Shaan-Gan-Ning Border Region and Shanxi-Chahar-Hebei Border Region were created. They were controlled by CCP. To raise funds, the CCP in the Shaan-Gan-Ning Base Area fostered and taxed opium production and dealing, selling to Japanese-occupied and KMT-controlled provinces. The CCP's Red Army fought alongside KMT forces during the Battle of Taiyuan, and the high point of their cooperation came in 1938 during the Battle of Wuhan.

Despite Japan's steady territorial gains in northern China, the coastal regions, and the rich Yangtze River Valley in central China, the distrust between the two antagonists was scarcely veiled. The uneasy alliance began to break down by late 1938, partially due to the Communists' aggressive efforts to expand their military strength by absorbing Chinese guerrilla forces behind Japanese lines. Chinese militia who refused to switch their allegiance were often labelled "collaborators" and attacked by CCP forces. For example, the Red Army led by He Long attacked and wiped out a brigade of Chinese militia led by Zhang Yin-wu in Hebei in June 1939. Starting in 1940, open conflict between Nationalists and Communists became more frequent in the occupied areas outside of Japanese control, culminating in the New Fourth Army Incident in January 1941.

Afterwards, the Second United Front completely broke down and Chinese Communists leader Mao Zedong outlined the preliminary plan for the CCP's eventual seizure of power from Chiang Kai-shek. Mao began his final push for consolidation of CCP power under his authority, and his teachings became the central tenets of the CCP doctrine that came to be formalized as "Mao Zedong Thought". The communists also began to focus most of their energy on building up their sphere of influence wherever opportunities were presented, mainly through rural mass organizations, administrative, land and tax reform measures favouring poor peasants; while the Nationalists attempted to neutralize the spread of Communist influence by military blockade of areas controlled by CCP and fighting the Japanese at the same time.

Entrance of the Western Allies

Following the attack on Pearl Harbor, the United States declared war against Japan, and within days China joined the Allies in formal declaration of war against Japan, Germany and Italy. As the Western Allies entered the war against Japan, the Sino-Japanese War would become part of a greater conflict, the Pacific theatre of World War II. Almost immediately, Chinese troops achieved another decisive victory in the Battle of Changsha, which earned the Chinese government much prestige from the Western Allies. President Franklin D. Roosevelt referred to the United States, United Kingdom, Soviet Union and China as the world's "Four Policemen"; his primary reason for elevating China to such a status was the belief that after the war it would serve as a bulwark against the Soviet Union.

Knowledge of Japanese naval movements in the Pacific was provided to the American Navy by the Sino-American Cooperative Organization (SACO) which was run by the Chinese intelligence head Dai Li. Philippine and Japanese ocean weather was affected by weather originating near northern China. The base of SACO was located in Yangjiashan.

Chiang Kai-shek continued to receive supplies from the United States. However, in contrast to the Arctic supply route to the Soviet Union which stayed open through most of the war, sea routes to China and the Yunnan–Vietnam Railway had been closed since 1940. Therefore, between the closing of the Burma Road in 1942 and its re-opening as the Ledo Road in 1945, foreign aid was largely limited to what could be flown in over "The Hump". In Burma, on 16 April 1942, 7,000 British soldiers were encircled by the Japanese 33rd Division during the Battle of Yenangyaung and rescued by the Chinese 38th Division. After the Doolittle Raid, the Imperial Japanese Army conducted a massive sweep through Zhejiang and Jiangxi of China, now known as the Zhejiang-Jiangxi Campaign, with the goal of finding the surviving American airmen, applying retribution on the Chinese who aided them and destroying air bases. The operation started 15 May 1942, with 40 infantry battalions and 15–16 artillery battalions but was repelled by Chinese forces in September. During this campaign, the Imperial Japanese Army left behind a trail of devastation and also spread cholera, typhoid, plague and dysentery pathogens. Chinese estimates allege that as many as 250,000 civilians, the vast majority of whom were destitute Tanka boat people and other pariah ethnicities unable to flee, may have died of disease. It caused more than 16 million civilians to evacuate far away deep inward China. 90% of Ningbo's population had already fled before battle started.

Most of China's industry had already been captured or destroyed by Japan, and the Soviet Union refused to allow the United States to supply China through Kazakhstan into Xinjiang as the Xinjiang warlord Sheng Shicai had turned anti-Soviet in 1942 with Chiang's approval. For these reasons, the Chinese government never had the supplies and equipment needed to mount major counter-offensives. Despite the severe shortage of matériel, in 1943, the Chinese were successful in repelling major Japanese offensives in Hubei and Changde.

Chiang was named Allied commander-in-chief in the China theater in 1942. American general Joseph Stilwell served for a time as Chiang's chief of staff, while simultaneously commanding American forces in the China-Burma-India Theater. For many reasons, relations between Stilwell and Chiang soon broke down. Many historians (such as Barbara W. Tuchman) have suggested it was largely due to the corruption and inefficiency of the Kuomintang government, while others (such as Ray Huang and Hans van de Ven) have depicted it as a more complicated situation. Stilwell had a strong desire to assume total control of Chinese troops and pursue an aggressive strategy, while Chiang preferred a patient and less expensive strategy of out-waiting the Japanese. Chiang continued to maintain a defensive posture despite Allied pleas to actively break the Japanese blockade, because China had already suffered tens of millions of war casualties and believed that Japan would eventually capitulate in the face of America's overwhelming industrial output. For these reasons the other Allies gradually began to lose confidence in the Chinese ability to conduct offensive operations from the Asian mainland, and instead concentrated their efforts against the Japanese in the Pacific Ocean Areas and South West Pacific Area, employing an island hopping strategy.

Long-standing differences in national interest and political stance among China, the United States, and the United Kingdom remained in place. British Prime Minister Winston Churchill was reluctant to devote British troops, many of whom had been routed by the Japanese in earlier campaigns, to the reopening of the Burma Road; Stilwell, on the other hand, believed that reopening the road was vital, as all China's mainland ports were under Japanese control. The Allies' "Europe First" policy did not sit well with Chiang, while the later British insistence that China send more and more troops to Indochina for use in the Burma Campaign was seen by Chiang as an attempt to use Chinese manpower to defend British colonial possessions. Chiang also believed that China should divert its crack army divisions from Burma to eastern China to defend the airbases of the American bombers that he hoped would defeat Japan through bombing, a strategy that American general Claire Lee Chennault supported but which Stilwell strongly opposed. In addition, Chiang voiced his support of Indian independence in a 1942 meeting with Mahatma Gandhi, which further soured the relationship between China and the United Kingdom.

American and Canadian-born Chinese were recruited to act as covert operatives in Japanese-occupied China. Employing their racial background as a disguise, their mandate was to blend in with local citizens and wage a campaign of sabotage. Activities focused on destruction of Japanese transportation of supplies (signaling bomber destruction of railroads, bridges).
Chinese forces advanced to northern Burma in late 1943, besieged Japanese troops in Myitkyina, and captured Mount Song.
The British and Commonwealth forces had their operation in Mission 204 which attempted to provide assistance to the Chinese Nationalist Army. The first phase in 1942 under command of SOE achieved very little, but lessons were learned and a second more successful phase, commenced in February 1943 under British Military command, was conducted before the Japanese Operation Ichi-Go offensive in 1944 compelled evacuation.

The United States saw the Chinese theater as a means to tie up a large number of Japanese troops, as well as being a location for American airbases from which to strike the Japanese home islands. In 1944, with the Japanese position in the Pacific deteriorating rapidly, the IJA mobilized over 500,000 men and launched Operation Ichi-Go, their largest offensive of World War II, to attack the American airbases in China and link up the railway between Manchuria and Vietnam. This brought major cities in Hunan, Henan and Guangxi under Japanese occupation. The failure of Chinese forces to defend these areas encouraged Stilwell to attempt to gain overall command of the Chinese army, and his subsequent showdown with Chiang led to his replacement by Major General Albert Coady Wedemeyer.

In 1944, China came off of several victories against Japan in Burma leading to overconfidence. Nationalist China also diverted soldiers to Xinjiang since 1942 to retake the province from the Soviet client Sheng Shicai whose puppet army was backed by the Soviet Red Army 8th Regiment in Hami, Xinjiang since the Soviet invasion of Xinjiang in 1934 when the Soviets occupied northern Xinjiang and the Islamic rebellion in Xinjiang in 1937 when the Soviets occupied southern Xinjiang as well placing all of Xinjiang under Sheng Shicai and Soviet Communist control. The fighting then escalated in early 1944 with the Ili Rebellion with Soviet backed Uyghur Communist rebels, causing China to fight enemies on two fronts with 120,000 Chinese soldiers fighting against the Ili rebellion. The aim of the Japanese Operation Ichigo was to destroy American airfields in southern China that threatened the Japanese home islands with bombing and to link railways in Beijing, Hankou and Canton cities from northern China in Beijing to southern China's coast on Canton. Japan was alarmed by American air raids against Japanese forces in Taiwan's Hsinchu airfield by American bombers based in southern China, correctly deducing that southern China could become the base of a major American bombing campaign against the Japanese home islands so Japan resolved to destroy and capture all airbases where American bombers operated from in Operation Ichigo.

Chiang Kai-shek and the Republic of China authorities deliberately ignored and dismissed a tip passed on to the Chinese government in Chongqing by the French military that the French picked up in colonial French Indochina on the impending Japanese offensive to link the three cities. The Chinese military believed it to be a fake tip planted by Japan to mislead them, since only 30,000 Japanese soldiers started the first maneuver of Operation Ichigo in northern China crossing the Yellow river, so the Chinese assumed it would be a local operation in northern China only. Another major factor was that the battlefront between China and Japan was static and stabilized since 1940 and continued for four years that way until Operation Ichigo in 1944, so Chiang assumed that Japan would continue the same posture and remain behind the lines in pre-1940 occupied territories of north China only, bolstering the puppet Chinese government of Wang Jingwei and exploiting resources there. The Japanese had indeed acted this way from 1940 to 1944, with the Japanese only making a few failed weak attempts to capture China's provisional capital in Chongqing on the Yangtze river, which they quickly abandoned before 1944. Japan also exhibited no intention before of linking the transcontinental Beijing Hankow Canton railways.

China also was made confident by its three victories in a row defending Changsha against Japan in 1939, 1941, and 1942. China had also defeated Japan in the India-Burma theater in Southeast Asia with X Force and Y Force and the Chinese could not believe Japan had carelessly let information slip into French hands, believing Japan deliberately fed misinformation to the French to divert Chinese troops from India and Burma. China believed the Burma theater to be far more important for Japan than southern China and that Japanese forces in southern China would continue to assume a defensive posture only. China believed the initial Japanese attack in Ichigo to be a localized feint and distraction in northern China so Chinese troops numbering 400,000 in North China deliberately withdrew without a fight when Japan attacked, assuming it was just another localized operation after which the Japanese would withdraw. This mistake led to the collapse of Chinese defensive lines as the Japanese soldiers, which eventually numbered in the hundreds of thousands, kept pressing the attack from northern China to central China to southern China's provinces as Chinese soldiers deliberately withdrew leading to confusion and collapse, except at the Defense of Hengyang where 17,000 outnumbered Chinese soldiers held out against over 110,000 Japanese soldiers for months in the longest siege of the war, inflicting 19,000–60,000 deaths on the Japanese. At Tushan in Guizhou province, the Nationalist government of China was forced to deploy five armies of the 8th war zone that they were using for the entire war up to Ichigo to contain the Communist Chinese to instead fight Japan. But at that point, dietary deficiencies of Japanese soldiers and increasing casualties suffered by Japan forced Japan to end Operation Ichigo in Guizhou, causing the operation to cease. After Operation Ichigo, Chiang Kai-shek started a plan to withdraw Chinese troops from the Burma theatre against Japan in Southeast Asia for a counter offensive called "White Tower" and "Iceman" against Japanese soldiers in China in 1945.

By the end of 1944, Chinese troops under the command of Sun Li-jen attacking from India, and those under Wei Lihuang attacking from Yunnan, joined forces in Mong-Yu, successfully driving the Japanese out of North Burma and securing the Ledo Road, China's vital supply artery. In Spring 1945 the Chinese launched offensives that retook Hunan and Guangxi. With the Chinese army progressing well in training and equipment, Wedemeyer planned to launch Operation Carbonado in summer 1945 to retake Guangdong, thus obtaining a coastal port, and from there drive northwards toward Shanghai. However, the atomic bombings of Hiroshima and Nagasaki and Soviet invasion of Manchuria hastened Japanese surrender and these plans were not put into action.

Foreign aid and support to China

Before the start of full-scale warfare of the Second Sino-Japanese War, Germany had since the time of the Weimar Republic, provided much equipment and training to crack units of the National Revolutionary Army of China, including some aerial-combat training with the Luftwaffe to some pilots of pre-Nationalist Air Force of China. A number of foreign powers including the Americans, Italians, Japanese providing training and equipment to different air force units of pre-war China. With the outbreak of full-scale war between China and the Empire of Japan, the Soviet Union became the primary supporter for China's war of resistance through the Sino-Soviet Non-Aggression Pact from 1937 to 1941. When the Imperial Japanese invaded French Indochina, the United States enacted the oil and steel embargo against Japan and froze all Japanese assets in 1941, and with it came the Lend-Lease Act of which China became a beneficiary on 6 May 1941; from there, China's main diplomatic, financial and military supporter came from the U.S., particularly following the attack on Pearl Harbor.

Overseas Chinese
Over 3,200 overseas Chinese drivers and motor vehicle mechanics embarked to wartime China to support military and logistics supply lines, especially through Indo-China, which became of absolute tantamount importance when the Japanese cut-off all ocean-access to China's interior with the capture of Nanning after the Battle of South Guangxi. Overseas Chinese communities in the U.S. raised money and nurtured talent in response to Imperial Japan's aggressions in China, which helped to fund an entire squadron of Boeing P-26 Model 281 fighter planes purchased for the looming war situation between China and the Empire of Japan; over a dozen Chinese-American aviators, including John "Buffalo" Huang, Arthur Chin, Hazel Ying Lee, Chan Kee-Wong et al., formed the original contingent of foreign volunteer aviators to join the Chinese air forces (some provincial or warlord air forces, but ultimately all integrating into the centralized Chinese Air Force; often called the Nationalist Air Force of China) in the "patriotic call to duty for the motherland" to fight against the Imperial Japanese invasion. Several of the original Chinese-American volunteer pilots were sent to Lagerlechfeld Air Base in Germany for aerial-gunnery training by the Chinese Air Force in 1936.

German

Prior to the war, Germany and China were in close economic and military cooperation, with Germany helping China modernize its industry and military in exchange for raw materials. Germany sent military advisers such as Alexander von Falkenhausen to China to help the KMT government reform its armed forces. Some divisions began training to German standards and were to form a relatively small but well trained Chinese Central Army. By the mid-1930s about 80,000 soldiers had received German-style training.  After the KMT lost Nanjing and retreated to Wuhan, Hitler's government decided to withdraw its support of China in 1938 in favour of an alliance with Japan as its main anti-Communist partner in East Asia.

Soviet

After Germany and Japan signed the anti-communist Anti-Comintern Pact, the Soviet Union hoped to keep China fighting, in order to deter a Japanese invasion of Siberia and save itself from a two-front war. In September 1937, they signed the Sino-Soviet Non-Aggression Pact and approved Operation Zet, the formation of a secret Soviet volunteer air force, in which Soviet technicians upgraded and ran some of China's transportation systems. Bombers, fighters, supplies and advisors arrived, including Soviet general Vasily Chuikov, future victor in the Battle of Stalingrad. Prior to the Western Allies, the Soviets provided the most foreign aid to China: some $250 million in credits for munitions and other supplies. The Soviet Union defeated Japan in the Battles of Khalkhin Gol in May – September 1939, leaving the Japanese reluctant to fight the Soviets again. In April 1941, Soviet aid to China ended with the Soviet–Japanese Neutrality Pact and the beginning of the Great Patriotic War. This pact enabled the Soviet Union to avoid fighting against Germany and Japan at the same time. In August 1945, the Soviet Union annulled the neutrality pact with Japan and invaded Manchuria, Inner Mongolia, the Kuril Islands, and northern Korea. The Soviets also continued to support the Chinese Communist Party. In total, 3,665 Soviet advisors and pilots served in China, and 227 of them died fighting there.

Western allies

The United States generally avoided taking sides between Japan and China until 1940, providing virtually no aid to China in this period. For instance, the 1934 Silver Purchase Act signed by President Roosevelt caused chaos in China's economy which helped the Japanese war effort. The 1933 Wheat and Cotton Loan mainly benefited American producers, while aiding to a smaller extent both Chinese and Japanese alike. This policy was due to US fear of breaking off profitable trade ties with Japan, in addition to US officials and businesses perception of China as a potential source of massive profit for the US by absorbing surplus American products, as William Appleman Williams states.

From December 1937, events such as the Japanese attack on USS Panay and the Nanjing Massacre swung public opinion in the West sharply against Japan and increased their fear of Japanese expansion, which prompted the United States, the United Kingdom, and France to provide loan assistance for war supply contracts to China. Australia also prevented a Japanese government-owned company from taking over an iron mine in Australia, and banned iron ore exports in 1938. However, in July 1939, negotiations between Japanese Foreign Minister Arita Khatira and the British Ambassador in Tokyo, Robert Craigie, led to an agreement by which the United Kingdom recognized Japanese conquests in China. At the same time, the US government extended a trade agreement with Japan for six months, then fully restored it. Under the agreement, Japan purchased trucks for the Kwantung Army, machine tools for aircraft factories, strategic materials (steel and scrap iron up to 16 October 1940, petrol and petroleum products up to 26 June 1941), and various other much-needed supplies.

In a hearing before the United States Congress House of Representatives Committee on Foreign Affairs on Wednesday, 19 April 1939, the acting chairman Sol Bloom and other Congressmen interviewed Maxwell S. Stewart, a former Foreign Policy Association research staff and economist who charged that America's Neutrality Act and its "neutrality policy" was a massive farce which only benefited Japan and that Japan did not have the capability nor could ever have invaded China without the massive amount of raw material America exported to Japan. America exported far more raw material to Japan than to China in the years 1937–1940. According to the United States Congress, the U.S.'s third largest export destination was Japan until 1940 when France overtook it due to France being at war too. Japan's military machine acquired all the war materials, automotive equipment, steel, scrap iron, copper, oil, that it wanted from the United States in 1937–1940 and was allowed to purchase aerial bombs, aircraft equipment, and aircraft from America up to the summer of 1938. War essentials exports from the United States to Japan increased by 124% along with a general increase of 41% of all exports from 1936 to 1937 when Japan invaded China. Japan's war economy was fueled by exports to the United States at over twice the rate immediately preceding the war. 41.6 percent of pig iron, 59.7 percent of scrap iron and 91.2 percent of automobiles and automobile parts of Japan were imported from the United States, as Japan needed to supply huge armies some aggregating 800,000 soldiers, in China. According to the 1939 Reports to the Annual National Convention of the American Legion, in 1936 1,467,639 tons of scrap metal from all foreign nations were exported to Japan while since 1937 Japan's dependence on the United States of America grew massively for war materials and supplies against China. The US contributed massively to the Japanese war economy in 1937 with 20.4% of zinc, 48.5% of engines and machinery, 59.7% of iron, 41.6% of pig iron, 60.5% of oil, 91.2% of automobiles and parts, 92.9% of copper of Japan were imported from the U.S. in 1937 according to a hearing by the United States Congress Senate Committee on Foreign Relations. From 1937 to 1940, the US exported a total of $986.7 million to Japan. The total value of military supplies was $703.9 million. During the Japanese war against China, 54.4% of Japan's weapons and supplies were provided by Americans. 76% of Japanese planes came from the US in 1938, and all lubricating oil, machine tools, special steel, high-test aircraft petrol came from the US, as did 59.7% of Japan's scrap iron and 60.5% of Japan's petrol in 1937. Japan freely bought weapons from U.S. companies, even as the U.S. Government barred the sale of weapons to Republican Spain. From 1937 to 1940, Japanese bombers were fueled with American oil and Japanese weapons were made out of American scrap iron. America supplied Japan with 54.4% of its war materials in 1937 when Japan invaded China, increasing to 56% in 1938. Japan by itself had scant and meager resources and could not have prosecuted war against China or dreamed of empire without massive imports. The Dutch East Indies, the British Empire and United States of America were the top exporters of war supplies for Japan's military against China in 1937, with 7.4% from the Dutch, 17.5% from the British and 54.4% from the United States of America. Oil, scrap iron and rubber were all sold by France, the Netherlands, the United Kingdom and the U.S. to Japan after the invasion of China in 1937. On 15 September 1939, two weeks after the outbreak of World War II in Europe, American oil companies unveiled contracts to deliver three million barrels of petroleum to the Imperial Japanese Navy.

Japan invaded and occupied the northern part of French Indochina (present-day Vietnam, Laos, Cambodia) in September 1940 to prevent China from receiving the 10,000 tons of materials delivered monthly by the Allies via the Haiphong–Yunnan Fou Railway line.

On 22 June 1941, Germany attacked the Soviet Union. In spite of non-aggression pacts or trade connections, Hitler's assault threw the world into a frenzy of re-aligning political outlooks and strategic prospects.

On 21 July, Japan occupied the southern part of French Indochina (southern Vietnam and Cambodia), contravening a 1940 "gentlemen's agreement" not to move into southern French Indochina. From bases in Cambodia and southern Vietnam, Japanese planes could attack Malaya, Singapore, and the Dutch East Indies. As the Japanese occupation of northern French Indochina in 1940 had already cut off supplies from the West to China, the move into southern French Indochina was viewed as a direct threat to British and Dutch colonies. Many principal figures in the Japanese government and military (particularly the navy) were against the move, as they foresaw that it would invite retaliation from the West.

On 24 July 1941, Roosevelt requested Japan withdraw all its forces from Indochina. Two days later the US and the UK began an oil embargo; two days after that the Netherlands joined them. This was a decisive moment in the Second Sino-Japanese War. The loss of oil imports made it impossible for Japan to continue operations in China on a long-term basis. It set the stage for Japan to launch a series of military attacks against the Allies, including the attack on Pearl Harbor on 7 December 1941.

In mid-1941, the United States government financed the creation of the American Volunteer Group (AVG), or Flying Tigers, to replace the withdrawn Soviet volunteers and aircraft. Contrary to popular perception, the Flying Tigers did not enter actual combat until after the United States had declared war on Japan. Led by Claire Lee Chennault, their early combat success of 300 kills against a loss of 12 of their newly introduced shark painted P-40 fighters heavily armed with 6X50 caliber machine guns and very fast diving speeds earned them wide recognition at a time when the Chinese Air Force and Allies in the Pacific and SE Asia were suffering heavy losses, and soon afterwards their "boom and zoom" high-speed hit-and-run dissimilar air combat tactics would be adopted by the United States Army Air Forces.

The Sino-American Cooperative Organization was an organization created by the SACO Treaty signed by the Republic of China and the United States of America in 1942 that established a mutual intelligence gathering entity in China between the respective nations against Japan. It operated in China jointly along with the Office of Strategic Services (OSS), America's first intelligence agency and forerunner of the CIA while also serving as joint training program between the two nations. Among all the wartime missions that Americans set up in China, SACO was the only one that adopted a policy of "total immersion" with the Chinese. The "Rice Paddy Navy" or "What-the-Hell Gang" operated in the China-Burma-India theater, advising and training, forecasting weather and scouting landing areas for USN fleet and Gen Claire Chennault's 14th AF, rescuing downed American flyers, and intercepting Japanese radio traffic. An underlying mission objective during the last year of war was the development and preparation of the China coast for Allied penetration and occupation. Fujian was scouted as a potential staging area and springboard for the future military landing of the Allies of World War II in Japan.

In February 1941 a Sino-British agreement was forged whereby British troops would assist the Chinese "Surprise Troops" units of guerrillas already operating in China, and China would assist Britain in Burma.

A British-Australian commando operation, Mission 204, was initialized in February 1942 to provide training to Chinese guerrilla troops. The mission conducted two operations, mostly in the provinces of Yunnan and Jiangxi. The first phase achieved very little but a second more successful phase was conducted before withdrawal.

Commandos working with the Free Thai Movement also operated in China, mostly while on their way into Thailand.

After the Japanese blocked the Burma Road in April 1942, and before the Ledo Road was finished in early 1945, the majority of US and British supplies to the Chinese had to be delivered via airlift over the eastern end of the Himalayan Mountains known as the Hump. Flying over the Himalayas was extremely dangerous, but the airlift continued daily to August 1945, at great cost in men and aircraft.

Involvement of French Indochina

The Chinese Kuomintang also supported the Vietnamese Việt Nam Quốc Dân Đảng (VNQDD) in its battle against French and Japanese imperialism.

In Guangxi, Chinese military leaders were organizing Vietnamese nationalists against the Japanese. The VNQDD had been active in Guangxi and some of their members had joined the KMT army. Under the umbrella of KMT activities, a broad alliance of nationalists emerged. With Ho at the forefront, the Viet Nam Doc Lap Dong Minh Hoi (Vietnamese Independence League, usually known as the Viet Minh) was formed and based in the town of Jingxi. The pro-VNQDD nationalist Ho Ngoc Lam, a KMT army officer and former disciple of Phan Bội Châu, was named as the deputy of Phạm Văn Đồng, later to be Ho's Prime Minister. The front was later broadened and renamed the Viet Nam Giai Phong Dong Minh (Vietnam Liberation League).

The Viet Nam Revolutionary League was a union of various Vietnamese nationalist groups, run by the pro Chinese VNQDD. Chinese KMT General Zhang Fakui created the league to further Chinese influence in Indochina, against the French and Japanese. Its stated goal was for unity with China under the Three Principles of the People, created by KMT founder Dr. Sun and opposition to Japanese and French Imperialists. The Revolutionary League was controlled by Nguyen Hai Than, who was born in China and could not speak Vietnamese. General Zhang shrewdly blocked the Communists of Vietnam, and Ho Chi Minh from entering the league, as Zhang's main goal was Chinese influence in Indochina. The KMT utilized these Vietnamese nationalists during World War II against Japanese forces. Franklin D. Roosevelt, through General Stilwell, privately made it clear that they preferred that the French not reacquire French Indochina (modern day Vietnam, Cambodia, and Laos) after the war was over. Roosevelt offered Chiang Kai-shek control of all of Indochina. It was said that Chiang Kai-shek replied: "Under no circumstances!"

After the war, 200,000 Chinese troops under General Lu Han were sent by Chiang Kai-shek to northern Indochina (north of the 16th parallel) to accept the surrender of Japanese occupying forces there, and remained in Indochina until 1946, when the French returned. The Chinese used the VNQDD, the Vietnamese branch of the Chinese Kuomintang, to increase their influence in French Indochina and to put pressure on their opponents. Chiang Kai-shek threatened the French with war in response to maneuvering by the French and Ho Chi Minh's forces against each other, forcing them to come to a peace agreement. In February 1946, he also forced the French to surrender all of their concessions in China and to renounce their extraterritorial privileges in exchange for the Chinese withdrawing from northern Indochina and allowing French troops to reoccupy the region. Following France's agreement to these demands, the withdrawal of Chinese troops began in March 1946.

Contemporaneous rebellions
Rebellion occurred in the Xinjiang province in 1937 when a pro-Soviet General Sheng Shicai invaded the province accompanied by Soviet troops. The invasion was resisted by General Ma Hushan of the KMT 36th Division.

General Ma Hushan was expecting help from Nanjing, as he exchanged messages with Chiang regarding the Soviet attack. But, both the Second Sino-Japanese War and the Xinjiang War erupted simultaneously leaving Chiang and Ma Hushan each on their own to confront the Japanese and Soviet forces.

The Republic of China government was fully aware of the Soviet invasion of Xinjiang province, and Soviet troops moving around Xinjiang and Gansu, but it was forced to mask these maneuvers to the public as "Japanese propaganda" to avoid an international incident and for continued military supplies from the Soviets.

Because the pro-Soviet governor Sheng Shicai controlled Xinjiang, which was garrisoned with Soviet troops in Turfan, the Chinese government had to keep troops stationed there as well.

General Ma Buqing was in virtual control of the Gansu corridor at that time. Ma Buqing had earlier fought against the Japanese, but because the Soviet threat was great, Chiang changed Ma's position, in July 1942, by instructing Ma to move 30,000 of his troops to the Tsaidam marsh in the Qaidam Basin of Qinghai. Chiang named Ma as Reclamation Commissioner, to threaten Sheng Shicai's southern flank in Xinjiang, which bordered Tsaidam.

After Ma evacuated his positions in Gansu, Kuomintang troops from central China flooded the area, and infiltrated Soviet occupied Xinjiang, gradually reclaiming it and forcing Sheng Shicai to break with the Soviets. The Kuomintang ordered Ma Bufang several times to march his troops into Xinjiang to intimidate the pro-Soviet Governor Sheng Shicai. This helped provide protection for Chinese settling in Xinjiang.

The Ili Rebellion broke out in Xinjiang when the Kuomintang Hui Officer Liu Bin-Di was killed while fighting Turkic Uyghur rebels in November 1944. The Soviet Union supported the Turkic rebels against the Kuomintang, and Kuomintang forces fought back.

Ethnic minorities

Japan attempted to reach out to Chinese ethnic minorities in order to rally them to their side against the Han Chinese, but only succeeded with certain Manchu, Mongol, Uyghur and Tibetan elements.

The Japanese attempt to get the Muslim Hui people on their side failed, as many Chinese generals such as Bai Chongxi, Ma Hongbin, Ma Hongkui, and Ma Bufang were Hui. The Japanese attempted to approach Ma Bufang but were unsuccessful in making any agreement with him. Ma Bufang ended up supporting the anti-Japanese Imam Hu Songshan, who prayed for the destruction of the Japanese. Ma became chairman (governor) of Qinghai in 1938 and commanded a group army. He was appointed because of his anti-Japanese inclinations, and was such an obstruction to Japanese agents trying to contact the Tibetans that he was called an "adversary" by a Japanese agent.

Hui Muslims

Hui cemeteries were destroyed for military reasons. Many Hui fought in the war against the Japanese such as Bai Chongxi, Ma Hongbin, Ma Hongkui, Ma Bufang, Ma Zhanshan, Ma Biao, Ma Zhongying, Ma Buqing and Ma Hushan. Qinghai Tibetans served in the Qinghai army against the Japanese. The Qinghai Tibetans view the Tibetans of Central Tibet (Tibet proper, ruled by the Dalai Lamas from Lhasa) as distinct and different from themselves, and even take pride in the fact that they were not ruled by Lhasa ever since the collapse of the Tibetan Empire.

Xining was subjected to aerial bombardment by Japanese warplanes in 1941, causing all ethnicities in Qinghai to unite against the Japanese. General Han Youwen directed the defense of the city of Xining during air raids by Japanese planes. Han survived an aerial bombardment by Japanese planes in Xining while he was being directed via telephone by Ma Bufang, who hid in an air raid shelter in a military barracks. The bombing resulted in Han being buried in rubble, though he was later rescued.

John Scott reported in 1934 that there was both strong anti-Japanese feeling and anti-Bolshevik among the Muslims of Gansu and he mentioned the Muslim generals Ma Fuxiang, Ma Qi, Ma Anliang and Ma Bufang who was chairman of Qinghai province when he stayed in Xining.

Conclusion and aftermath

End of the Pacific War and surrender of Japanese troops in China

The United States and the Soviet Union put an end to the war by attacking the Japanese with a new weapon (on the United States' part) and an incursion into Manchuria (on the Soviet Union's part). On 6 August 1945, an American B-29 bomber, the Enola Gay, dropped the first atomic bomb used in combat on Hiroshima, killing tens of thousands and leveling the city. On 9 August 1945, the Soviet Union renounced its non-aggression pact with Japan and attacked the Japanese in Manchuria, fulfilling its Yalta Conference pledge to attack the Japanese within three months after the end of the war in Europe. The attack was made by three Soviet army groups. On that same day, a second more destructive atomic bomb was dropped by the United States on Nagasaki.

In less than two weeks the Kwantung Army, which was the primary Japanese fighting force, consisting of over a million men but lacking in adequate armour, artillery, or air support, had been destroyed by the Soviets. Japanese Emperor Hirohito officially capitulated to the Allies on 15 August 1945. The official surrender was signed aboard the battleship  on 2 September 1945, in a ceremony where several Allied commanders including Chinese general Hsu Yung-chang were present.

After the Allied victory in the Pacific, General Douglas MacArthur ordered all Japanese forces within China (excluding Manchuria), Taiwan and French Indochina north of 16° north latitude to surrender to Chiang Kai-shek, and the Japanese troops in China formally surrendered on 9 September 1945, at 9:00. The ninth hour of the ninth day of the ninth month was chosen in echo of the Armistice of 11 November 1918 (on the eleventh hour of the eleventh day of the eleventh month) and because "nine" is a homophone of the word for "long lasting" in Chinese (to suggest that the peace won would last forever).

Post-war struggle and resumption of civil war

In 1945, China emerged from the war nominally a great military power  but economically weak and on the verge of all-out civil war. The economy was sapped by the military demands of a long costly war and internal strife, by spiraling inflation, and by corruption in the Nationalist government that included profiteering, speculation and hoarding.

Furthermore, as part of the Yalta Conference, which allowed a Soviet sphere of influence in Manchuria, the Soviets dismantled and removed more than half of the industrial equipment left there by the Japanese before handing over Manchuria to China. Large swathes of the prime farming areas had been ravaged by the fighting and there was starvation in the wake of the war. Many towns and cities were destroyed, and millions were rendered homeless by floods.

The problems of rehabilitation and reconstruction after the ravages of a protracted war were staggering, and the war left the Nationalists severely weakened, and their policies left them unpopular. Meanwhile, the war strengthened the Communists both in popularity and as a viable fighting force. At Yan'an and elsewhere in the communist controlled areas, Mao Zedong was able to adapt Marxism–Leninism to Chinese conditions. He taught party cadres to lead the masses by living and working with them, eating their food, and thinking their thoughts.

The Chinese Red Army fostered an image of conducting guerrilla warfare in defense of the people. Communist troops adapted to changing wartime conditions and became a seasoned fighting force. With skillful organization and propaganda, the Communists increased party membership from 100,000 in 1937 to 1.2 million by 1945.

Mao also began to execute his plan to establish a new China by rapidly moving his forces from Yan'an and elsewhere to Manchuria. This opportunity was available to the Communists because although Nationalist representatives were not invited to Yalta, they had been consulted and had agreed to the Soviet invasion of Manchuria in the belief that the Soviet Union would cooperate only with the Nationalist government after the war.

However, the Soviet occupation of Manchuria was long enough to allow the Communist forces to move in en masse and arm themselves with the military hardware surrendered by the Imperial Japanese Army, quickly establish control in the countryside and move into position to encircle the Nationalist government army in major cities of northeast China. Following that, the Chinese Civil War broke out between the Nationalists and Communists, which concluded with the Communist victory in mainland China and the retreat of the Nationalists to Taiwan in 1949.

Aftermath

In the Chinese People's War of Resistance Against Japan Memorial near the Marco Polo Bridge and in mainland Chinese textbooks, the People's Republic of China (PRC) claims that the Nationalists mostly avoided fighting the Japanese to preserve their strength for a final showdown with the Chinese Communist Party, while the Communists were the main military force in the Chinese resistance efforts. Recently, however, with a change in the political climate, the CCP has admitted that certain Nationalist generals made important contributions in resisting the Japanese. The official history in mainland China now states that the KMT fought a bloody, yet indecisive, frontal war against Japan, while the CCP engaged the Japanese forces in far greater numbers behind enemy lines.

The Nationalists suffered higher casualties because they were the main combatants opposing the Japanese in each of the 22 major battles (involving more than 100,000 troops on both sides) between China and Japan. The Communist forces, by contrast, usually avoided pitched battles with the Japanese and generally limited their combat to guerrilla actions (the Hundred Regiments Offensive and the Battle of Pingxingguan are notable exceptions). The Nationalists committed their strongest divisions in early battle against the Japanese (including the 36th, 87th, 88th divisions, the crack divisions of Chiang's Central Army) to defend Shanghai and continued to deploy most of their forces to fight the Japanese even as the Communists changed their strategy to engage mainly in a political offensive against the Japanese while declaring that the CCP should "save and preserve our strength and wait for favourable timing" by the end of 1941.

Legacy

China-Japan relations
Today, the war is a major point of contention and resentment between China and Japan. The war remains a major roadblock for Sino-Japanese relations.

Issues regarding the current historical outlook on the war exist. For example, the Japanese government has been accused of historical revisionism by allowing the approval of a few school textbooks omitting or glossing over Japan's militant past, although the most recent controversial book, the New History Textbook was used by only 0.039% of junior high schools in Japan and despite the efforts of the Japanese nationalist textbook reformers, by the late 1990s the most common Japanese schoolbooks contained references to, for instance, the Nanjing Massacre, Unit 731, and the comfort women of World War II, all historical issues which have faced challenges from ultranationalists in the past.

Effects on Taiwan

Taiwan and the Penghu islands were put under the administrative control of the Republic of China (ROC) government in 1945 by the United Nations Relief and Rehabilitation Administration. The ROC proclaimed Taiwan Retrocession Day on 25 October 1945. However, due to the unresolved Chinese Civil War, neither the newly established People's Republic of China in mainland China nor the Nationalist ROC that retreated to Taiwan was invited to sign the Treaty of San Francisco, as neither had shown full and complete legal capacity to enter into an international legally binding agreement. Since China was not present, the Japanese only formally renounced the territorial sovereignty of Taiwan and Penghu islands without specifying to which country Japan relinquished the sovereignty, and the treaty was signed in 1951 and came into force in 1952.

In 1952, the Treaty of Taipei was signed separately between the ROC and Japan that basically followed the same guideline of the Treaty of San Francisco, not specifying which country has sovereignty over Taiwan. However, Article 10 of the treaty states that the Taiwanese people and the juridical person should be the people and the juridical person of the ROC. Both the PRC and ROC governments base their claims to Taiwan on the Japanese Instrument of Surrender which specifically accepted the Potsdam Declaration which refers to the Cairo Declaration. Disputes over the precise de jure sovereign of Taiwan persist to the present. On a de facto basis, sovereignty over Taiwan has been and continues to be exercised by the ROC. Japan's position has been to avoid commenting on Taiwan's status, maintaining that Japan renounced all claims to sovereignty over its former colonial possessions after World War II, including Taiwan.

Traditionally, the Republic of China government has held celebrations marking the Victory Day on 9 September (now known as Armed Forces Day) and Taiwan's Retrocession Day on 25 October. However, after the Democratic Progressive Party (DPP) won the presidential election in 2000, these national holidays commemorating the war have been cancelled as the pro-independent DPP does not see the relevancy of celebrating events that happened in mainland China.

Meanwhile, many KMT supporters, particularly veterans who retreated with the government in 1949, still have an emotional interest in the war. For example, in celebrating the 60th anniversary of the end of war in 2005, the cultural bureau of KMT stronghold Taipei held a series of talks in the Sun Yat-sen Memorial Hall regarding the war and post-war developments, while the KMT held its own exhibit in the KMT headquarters. Whereas the KMT won the presidential election in 2008, the ROC government resumed commemorating the war.

Japanese women left behind in China

Several thousand Japanese who were sent as colonizers to Manchukuo and Inner Mongolia were left behind in China. The majority of Japanese left behind in China were women, and these Japanese women mostly married Chinese men and became known as "stranded war wives" (zanryu fujin).

Korean women left behind in China

In China some Korean comfort women stayed behind instead of going back to their native land. Most Korean comfort women left behind in China married Chinese men.

Commemorations

Numerous monuments and memorials throughout China, including the Museum of the War of Chinese People's Resistance Against Japanese Aggression in Beijing's Wanping Fortress.

Casualties
The conflict lasted eight years, two months and two days (from 7 July 1937, to 9 September 1945). The total number of casualties that resulted from this war (and subsequently theater) equaled more than half the total number of casualties that later resulted from the entire Pacific War.

Chinese

 Dr Duncan Anderson, Head of the Department of War Studies at the Royal Military Academy, UK, writing for BBC states that the total number of casualties was around 20 million.
 The official PRC statistics for China's civilian and military casualties in the Second Sino-Japanese War from 1937 to 1945 are 20 million dead and 15 million wounded. The figures for total military casualties, killed and wounded are: NRA 3.2 million; People's Liberation Army 500,000.
 The official account of the war published in Taiwan reported that the Nationalist Chinese Army lost 3,238,000 men (1,797,000 wounded, 1,320,000 killed, and 120,000 missing) and 5,787,352 civilians casualties putting the total number of casualties at 9,025,352. The Nationalists fought in 22 major engagements, most of which involved more than 100,000 troops on both sides, 1,171 minor engagements most of which involved more than 50,000 troops on both sides, and 38,931 skirmishes.
 An academic study published in the United States estimates military casualties: 1.5 million killed in battle, 750,000 missing in action, 1.5 million deaths due to disease and 3 million wounded; civilian casualties: due to military activity, killed 1,073,496 and 237,319 wounded; 335,934 killed and 426,249 wounded in Japanese air attacks.
 According to historian Mitsuyoshi Himeta, at least 2.7 million civilians died during the "kill all, loot all, burn all" operation (Three Alls Policy, or sanko sakusen) implemented in May 1942 in north China by general Yasuji Okamura and authorized on 3 December 1941, by Imperial Headquarter Order number 575.
 The property loss suffered by the Chinese was valued at 383 billion US dollars according to the currency exchange rate in July 1937, roughly 50 times the gross domestic product of Japan at that time (US$7.7 billion).
 In addition, the war created 95 million refugees.
 Rudolph Rummel gave a figure of 3,949,000 people in China murdered directly by the Japanese army while giving a figure of 10,216,000 total dead in the war with the additional millions of deaths due to indirect causes like starvation, disease and disruption but not direct killing by Japan. China suffered from famines during the war caused by drought affected both China and India, Chinese famine of 1942–43 in Henan that led to starvation deaths of 2 to 3 million people, Guangdong famine caused more than 3 million people to flee or die, and the 1943–1945 Indian famine in Bengal that killed about 7 million Indian civilians in Bihar and Bengal.

Japanese
The Japanese recorded around 1.1 to 1.9 million military casualties during all of World War II (which include killed, wounded and missing). The official death toll of Japanese men killed in China, according to the Japan Defense Ministry, is 480,000. Based on the investigation of the Japanese Yomiuri Shimbun, the military death toll of Japan in China is about 700,000 since 1937 (excluding the deaths in Manchuria).

Another source from Hilary Conroy claims that a total of 447,000 Japanese soldiers died in China during the Second Sino-Japanese War. Of the 1,130,000 Imperial Japanese Army soldiers who died during World War II, 39 percent died in China.

Then in War Without Mercy, John W. Dower claims that a total of 396,000 Japanese soldiers died in China during the Second Sino-Japanese War. Of this number, the Imperial Japanese Army lost 388,605 soldiers and the Imperial Japanese Navy lost 8,000 soldiers. Another 54,000 soldiers also died after the war had ended, mostly from illness and starvation. Of the 1,740,955 Japanese soldiers who died during World War II, 22 percent died in China.

Japanese statistics, however, lack complete estimates for the wounded. From 1937 to 1941, 185,647 Japanese soldiers were killed in China and 520,000 were wounded. Disease also incurred critical losses on Japanese forces. From 1937 to 1941, 430,000 Japanese soldiers were recorded as being sick. In North China alone, 18,000 soldiers were evacuated back to Japan for illnesses in 1938, 23,000 in 1939, and 15,000 in 1940. From 1941 to 1945: 202,958 dead; another 54,000 dead after war's end. Chinese forces also report that by May 1945, 22,293 Japanese soldiers were captured as prisoners. Many more Japanese soldiers surrendered when the war ended.

Contemporary studies from the Beijing Central Compilation and Translation Press have revealed that the Japanese suffered a total of 2,227,200 casualties, including 1,055,000 dead and 1,172,341 injured. This Chinese publication analyzes statistics provided by Japanese publications and claimed these numbers were largely based on Japanese publications.

Both Nationalist and Communist Chinese sources report that their respective forces were responsible for the deaths of over 1.7 million Japanese soldiers. Nationalist War Minister He Yingqin himself contested the Communists' claims, finding it impossible for a force of "untrained, undisciplined, poorly equipped" guerrillas of Communist forces to have killed so many enemy soldiers.

The Nationalist Chinese authorities ridiculed Japanese estimates of Chinese casualties. In 1940, the National Herald stated that the Japanese exaggerated Chinese casualties, while deliberately concealing the true number of Japanese casualties, releasing false figures that made them appear lower. The article reports on the casualty situation of the war up to 1940.

Use of chemical and biological weapons

Despite Article 23 of the Hague Conventions of 1899 and 1907, article V of the Treaty in Relation to the Use of Submarines and Noxious Gases in Warfare, article 171 of the Treaty of Versailles and a resolution adopted by the League of Nations on 14 May 1938, condemning the use of poison gas by the Empire of Japan, the Imperial Japanese Army frequently used chemical weapons during the war. 

According to Walter E. Grunden, history professor at Bowling Green State University, Japan permitted the use of chemical weapons in China because the Japanese concluded that Chinese forces did not possess the capacity to retaliate in kind. The Japanese incorporated gas warfare into many aspects of their army, which includes special gas troops, infantry, artillery, engineers and air force; the Japanese were aware of basic gas tactics of other armies, and deployed multifarious gas warfare tactics in China. The Japanese were very dependent on gas weapons when they were engaged in chemical warfare.

Japan used poison gas at Hankow during the Battle of Wuhan to break fierce Chinese resistance after conventional Japanese assaults were repelled by Chinese defenders. Rana Mitter writes, 

According to Freda Utley, during the battle at Hankow, in areas where Japanese artillery or gunboats on the river could not reach Chinese defenders on hilltops, Japanese infantrymen had to fight Chinese troops on the hills. She noted that the Japanese were inferior at hand-to-hand combat against the Chinese, and resorted to deploying poison gas to defeat the Chinese troops. She was told by General Li Zongren that the Japanese consistently used tear gas and mustard gas against Chinese troops. Li also added that his forces could not withstand large scale deployments of Japanese poison gas. Since Chinese troops did not have gas-masks, the poison gases provided enough time for Japanese troops to bayonet debilitated Chinese soldiers.

During the battle in Yichang of October 1941, Japanese troops used chemical munitions in their artillery and mortar fire, and warplanes dropped gas bombs all over the area; since the Chinese troops were poorly equipped and without gas-masks, they were severely gassed, burned and killed.

According to historians Yoshiaki Yoshimi and Seiya Matsuno, the chemical weapons were authorized by specific orders given by Japanese Emperor Hirohito himself, transmitted by the Imperial General Headquarters. For example, the Emperor authorized the use of toxic gas on 375 separate occasions during the Battle of Wuhan from August to October 1938. They were also used during the invasion of Changde. Those orders were transmitted either by Prince Kan'in Kotohito or General Hajime Sugiyama. Gases manufactured in Okunoshima were used more than 2,000 times against Chinese soldiers and civilians in the war in China in the 1930s and 1940s

Bacteriological weapons provided by Shirō Ishii's units were also profusely used. For example, in 1940, the Imperial Japanese Army Air Force bombed Ningbo with fleas carrying the bubonic plague. During the Khabarovsk War Crime Trials the accused, such as Major General Kiyashi Kawashima, testified that, in 1941, some 40 members of Unit 731 air-dropped plague-contaminated fleas on Changde. These attacks caused epidemic plague outbreaks. In the Zhejiang-Jiangxi Campaign, of the 10,000 Japanese soldiers who fell ill with the disease, about 1,700 Japanese troops died when the biological weapons rebounded on their own forces.

Japan gave its own soldiers methamphetamines in the form of Philopon.

Use of suicide attacks
Chinese armies deployed "dare to die corps" or "suicide squads" against the Japanese.

Suicide bombing was also used against the Japanese. A Chinese soldier detonated a grenade vest and killed 20 Japanese at Sihang Warehouse. Chinese troops strapped explosives, such as grenade packs or dynamite to their bodies and threw themselves under Japanese tanks to blow them up. This tactic was used during the Battle of Shanghai, where a Chinese suicide bomber stopped a Japanese tank column by exploding himself beneath the lead tank, and at the Battle of Taierzhuang, where dynamite and grenades were strapped on by Chinese troops who rushed at Japanese tanks and blew themselves up. During one incident at Taierzhuang, Chinese suicide bombers destroyed four Japanese tanks with grenade bundles.

Combatants

See also

 Air Warfare of WWII from the Sino-Japanese War perspective
 Timeline of events leading to World War II in Asia
 List of military engagements of the Second Sino-Japanese War
 List of wars by death toll
 Stubborn Army

General
 History of China
 History of the Republic of China
 Military history of China
 History of Japan
 Military history of Japan
 Mao Zedong thanking Japan controversy

Notes

References

Citations

Bibliography 

 Bayly, C. A., and T. N. Harper. Forgotten Armies: The Fall of British Asia, 1941–1945. Cambridge, MA: Belknap Press of Harvard University Press, 2005. xxxiii, 555p. .
 Bayly, C. A., T. N. Harper. Forgotten Wars: Freedom and Revolution in Southeast Asia. Cambridge, MA: Belknap Press of Harvard University Press, 2007. xxx, 674p. .
 Benesch, Oleg. "Castles and the Militarisation of Urban Society in Imperial Japan," Transactions of the Royal Historical Society, Vol. 28 (Dec. 2018), pp. 107–134.
 Buss, Claude A. War And Diplomacy in Eastern Asia (1941) 570pp online free
 
 Gordon, David M. "The China–Japan War, 1931–1945" Journal of Military History (January 2006). v. 70#1, pp, 137–82.  Historiographical overview of major books from the 1970s through 2006
 Guo Rugui, editor-in-chief Huang Yuzhang,中国抗日战争正面战场作战记 China's Anti-Japanese War Combat Operations (Jiangsu People's Publishing House, 2005) . On line in Chinese: 中国抗战正向战场作战记
 
 
 . Reprinted : Abingdon, Oxon; New York: Routledge, 2015.  Chapters on military, economic, diplomatic aspects of the war.
 
 Annalee Jacoby and Theodore H. White, Thunder out of China, New York: William Sloane Associates, 1946. Critical account of Chiang's government by Time magazine reporters.
  – Book about the Chinese and Mongolians who fought for the Japanese during the war.
 
 Lary, Diana and Stephen R. Mackinnon, eds. The Scars of War: The Impact of Warfare on Modern China. Vancouver: UBC Press, 2001. 210p. .
 
 MacKinnon, Stephen R., Diana Lary and Ezra F. Vogel, eds. China at War: Regions of China, 1937–1945. Stanford University Press, 2007. xviii, 380p. .
 Macri, Franco David. Clash of Empires in South China: The Allied Nations' Proxy War with Japan, 1935–1941 (2015) online 
 
 Peattie, Mark. Edward Drea, and Hans van de Ven, eds. The Battle for China: Essays on the Military History of the Sino-Japanese War of 1937–1945 (Stanford University Press, 2011); 614 pages
 Quigley, Harold S. Far Eastern War 1937 1941 (1942) online free
  Steiner, Zara. "Thunder from the East: The Sino-Japanese Conflict and the European Powers, 1933=1938": in Steiner, The Triumph of the Dark: European International History 1933–1939 (2011) pp 474–551.
 
 
 Van de Ven, Hans, Diana Lary, Stephen MacKinnon, eds. Negotiating China's Destiny in World War II (Stanford University Press, 2014) 336 pp. online review 
 
 
 
  Issue 40 of China, a collection of pamphlets. Original from Pennsylvania State University. Digitized 15 September 2009

External links

 Full text of the Chinese declaration of war against Japan on Wikisource
 "CBI Theater of Operations" – IBIBLIO World War II: China Burma India Links to selected documents, photos, maps, and books.
 
 Annals of the Flying Tigers
 Perry–Castañeda Library Map Collection, China 1:250,000, Series L500, U.S. Army Map Service, 1954– . Topographic Maps of China during the Second World War.
 Perry–Castañeda Library Map Collection Manchuria 1:250,000, Series L542, U.S. Army Map Service, 1950– . Topographic Maps of Manchuria during the Second World War.
  Multi-year project seeks to expand research by promoting cooperation among scholars and institutions in China, Japan, the United States, and other nations. Includes extensive bibliographies.
 Photographs of the war from a Presbyterian mission near Canton
 "The Route South"

 
Wars involving Japan
Wars involving the Republic of China
Anti-Chinese violence in Asia
Anti-Japanese sentiment in China
China–Japan military relations
Invasions by Japan

Military history of the Republic of China (1912–1949)
Pacific theatre of World War II
Tunnel warfare
1930s in China
1940s in China
Invasions of China
Articles containing video clips
1930s in Japan
1940s in Vietnam
1930s conflicts
1940s conflicts
Sino-Japanese Wars